is a railway station located in the city of Semboku, Akita Prefecture, Japan, operated by JR East.

Lines
Sashimaki Station is served by the Tazawako Line, and is located 44.4 km from the terminus of the line at Morioka Station.

Station layout
The station has two opposed side platforms connected by a level crossing. The station is unattended.

Platforms

History
Sashimaki Station opened on August 31, 1923 as a station on the Japanese Government Railway (JGR), Obonai keiben-sen, serving the village of Obonai, Akita. The JGR became the Japanese National Railways (JNR) after World War II. The station was absorbed into the JR East network upon the privatization of the JNR on April 1, 1987. A new log cabin style station building was completed in March 1997.

Surrounding area

See also
 List of Railway Stations in Japan

External links

 JR East Station information 

Railway stations in Japan opened in 1923
Railway stations in Akita Prefecture
Tazawako Line
Semboku, Akita